Tvorogovo is a rural locality (a selo) in Kabansky District, Republic of Buryatia, Russia. The population was 669 as of 2010. There are 6 streets.

References 

Rural localities in Kabansky District